Caloschemia pulchra is a species of moth of the  family Callidulidae. It is found in Madagascar.

References

Callidulidae
Moths described in 1878
Moths of Madagascar
Moths of Africa